The 2020–21 Segunda División Pro, named Reto Iberdrola for sponsorship reasons, was the 20th season of the second highest league tier of women's football in Spain, and the second season under a new two-group format.

The system was adapted for this year only to two phases (initially split into four small groups on a geographical basis, then into four groups again to decide promotion and relegation) due to the impact of the COVID-19 pandemic in Spain and its related restrictions, which included all matches being played in empty stadiums, and the involvement of two more teams than the usual 32 after relegation was disregarded in the previous edition, while teams still came up from the third tier. No teams were relegated into the division from the previous top level campaign, and the season also began later than usual, on 18 October 2020.

Participating teams

North Group

South Group

First Phase

North Group

Subgroup North A

Source: FutbolME

Subgroup North B

Source: FutbolME

South Group

Subgroup A South

Source: FutbolME

Group B South

Source: FutbolME

Second Phase

Promotion groups

Group C North 

Source: FutbolME

Group C South 

Source: FutbolME

Relegation Groups

Group D North 

Source: FutbolME

Group D South 

Source: FutbolME

References

External links 
 RFEF
 FutFem
Primera División (women) at La Liga 

Spa
2
women's 2
Segunda Federación (women) seasons